Einar Benediktsson, often referred to as Einar Ben (31 October 1864 – 12 January 1940) was an Icelandic poet and lawyer.

Einar Benediktsson's poetry was a significant contribution to the nationalistic revival which led to Iceland's independence. To this end, he was active both in founding the Landvarnarflokkurinn in 1902, and as the editor of Iceland's first daily newspaper, Dagskrá, from 1896 to 1898. 
As a poet, he may be classified as a Neo-Romantic. He advocated for Greenland to become part of an independent Iceland.

He pioneered as a strong advocate of inward foreign investment to utilize Iceland's natural resources. 
In 1906 he joined the management of two companies, Skjálfanda and Gigant, formed to build and operate hydroelectric power plants, particularly the northern waterfalls of the Skjálfandafljót and Jökulsá á Fjöllum rivers.
Fund raising began, but there was opposition from people who objected to foreign involvement.
In 1914 Einar Benediktsson was one of the founders of Fossafélagið Títan and three sister companies Sirius, Orion and Taurus, established to harness the power of the Þjórsá waterfalls.

His translations include English, and American poetry, and a masterpiece in rendering Henrik Ibsen's epic, Peer Gynt, into Icelandic. Einar Benediktsson was buried at Iceland's national shrine, Þingvellir. He has descendants living today in Iceland, other European countries, and the United States, most notably including former ambassador and namesake Einar Benediktsson (b. 1931).

He resided at Höfði house in northern Reykjavík for twelve years (1913-1925). Einar's statue, made in 1964 by Ásmundur Sveinsson, was moved in 2015 from park Miklatún and now stands near the house.

Works
 1897: Sögur og kvæði (Stories and poems)
 1901: Pétur Gautur, translation from Henrik Ibsen's Peer Gynt.
 1906: Hafblik, poems
 1913: Hrannir, poems
 1921: Vogar, poems
 1930: Hvammar, poems

References

1864 births
1940 deaths
Icelandic male poets
19th-century Icelandic people
20th-century Icelandic people
19th-century Icelandic poets
20th-century Icelandic poets
Icelandic translators
19th-century male writers
20th-century male writers
19th-century translators